Margo Buchanan is a Scottish singer-songwriter, composer, musician, and recording artist. In a career spanning more than 30 years, Buchanan is best known for her work as a session backing vocalist.

Early years
Margo Buchanan was born in Lanark, Lanarkshire, Scotland. She moved to England when she was 12 years old and left school early. She worked at a number of odd jobs and started work as a musician at age 16. She lived for a while in Coventry and then moved to London. During these years, she was offered to work with the 2 Tone band The Specials on the condition that she bleached her hair blond, but she declined.

Music career
In London, Buchanan found work as a backing vocalist, working with artists including Deep Purple, Tina Turner, Bonnie Tyler, Shirley Bassey, Van Morrison, David Knopfler, Jools Holland, Sam Brown, David Gilmour, The Pet Shop Boys and Tracey Ullman. Although she was plagued with health issues through her twenties and thirties, she continued to work. Once her health problems were diagnosed, she expanded her work schedule.

Buchanan performed at the Concert for Diana held at the newly built Wembley Stadium in 2007, in honour of Diana, Princess of Wales, and at Queen Elizabeth II's Party at the Palace in 2002. She developed a teaching model called Learn to Sing in 2002. She has also worked with BBC Television on the national singing competition series Just the Two of Us.

Personal life
Buchanan is married to musician Paul Wickens. They have one child, and the couple currently live in London, UK. Buchanan suffers from coeliac disease, which means she is unable to digest gluten in breads and cereals.

Discography
Studio album
 I Should've Done This Years Ago (2005)

References

External links
Official website

21st-century Scottish women singers
Scottish session musicians
Scottish songwriters
Living people
People from Lanark
Year of birth missing (living people)
20th-century Scottish women singers